is the 47th single by Japanese boy band Arashi. It was released on September 2, 2015 under their record label J Storm. "Ai o Sakebe" was used as the background song for the Recruit Zexy commercial. The single sold 462,550 copies in its first week and topped the weekly Oricon Singles Chart. With over 519,000 copies sold, the single was certified Double Platinum by the Recording Industry Association of Japan (RIAJ). "Ai o Sakebe" placed 12th on Oricon's 2015 yearly singles ranking.

Single information
The single was released in two editions: a first press/limited edition and a regular edition. The regular edition contains the B-sides "It's good to be bad", "Yume ni Kakeru", and "I say" and the instrumentals for all four tracks. The first press/limited edition contains the B-sides "Yume ni Kakeru" and "Mr Lonely", instrumentals for "Ai o Sakebe" and "Mr Lonely", and a 20-page lyrics booklet. It also includes the music video and making-of for "Ai o Sakebe", the choreography video for "Ai o Sakebe", and a Japan Airlines (JAL) aircraft design unveiling video. The limited edition JAL aircraft was designed by Arashi member Ohno Satoshi for JAL's "Fly to 2020" campaign.  The album jacket covers for both versions are different.

"Ai o Sakebe" was used as the background song for the Recruit Zexy commercial. "Yume ni Kakeru" was used as the campaign song for JAL "Fly to 2020".

Track listing

Chart performance
The single debuted at number one on the Oricon daily singles chart selling 242,023 copies upon its release and selling 462,550 copies by the end of the week, topping the Oricon and Billboard Japan weekly singles charts. The single sold 29,131 copies in its second week and stayed in the top ten for three consecutive weeks. With 519,330 copies sold, the single placed 12th on Oricon's 2015 yearly singles ranking and second on Billboard Japans top singles year-end list.

Charts and certifications

Charts

Sales and certifications

Release history

References

External links
Ai o Sakebe product information 
Hard Copy Sales Certifications Recording Industry Association of Japan (RIAJ)

2015 songs
Arashi songs